The Messerschmitt-Bölkow-Blohm Bo 105 is a light, twin-engine, multi-purpose helicopter developed by Bölkow of Ottobrunn, West Germany. It was the first light twin-engine helicopter in the world, and the first rotorcraft that could perform aerobatic maneuvers such as inverted loops. The Bo 105 features a revolutionary hingeless rotor system, a pioneering innovation in helicopters when it was introduced into service in 1970. Production of the Bo 105 began at the then-recently merged Messerschmitt-Bölkow-Blohm (MBB).

The main production facilities for producing the Bo 105 were located in Germany and Canada; due to the level of export sales encountered, additional manufacturing lines were set up in Spain, Indonesia, and the Philippines. MBB became a part of Eurocopter in 1991, who continued production of the type until 2001. The Bo 105 was formally replaced in Eurocopter's product range by the newer Eurocopter EC135.

Development
In 1964, development work began at Bölkow upon the helicopter that would become the Bo 105, although work on the hingeless rotor it would use had begun earlier. On 16 February 1967, the second Bo 105A prototype conducted its maiden flight at Ottobrunn in Germany; the first public demonstration was held in May 1967. The test program was broken down into stages as the Bo 105 comprised a new airframe, new rotor system, and a new engine; thus the flying Bo 105 prototype was initially equipped with a main rotor from Westland Helicopter's Scout rotorcraft and a pair of Allison Model 250 turboshaft engines instead of their production counterparts. Sud Aviation worked with Bölkow on developing the rotorcraft; an Alouette II helicopter was modified with the Bo 105's rotor and used to test its performance envelope. The third Bo 105 prototype was equipped with the initial production standard MAN Turbo 6022 turboshaft engines; six pre-production Bo 105s were constructed for testing.

On 13 October 1970, the German Civil Aviation Authority certified the Bo 105; initial deliveries for the first customers, ADAC Air Rescue and the Bavarian State Police, took place shortly thereafter. In 1972, further type certification was granted by the Federal Aviation Administration (FAA) and the Civil Aviation Authority (CAA), enabling export orders from the United States and Britain respectively, which soon followed. In 1972, an improved version of the rotorcraft with more powerful engines, the Bo 105C, was developed; this model quickly superseded the Bo 105A. On 25 September 1973, the prototype Bo 106 performed its first flight; the Bo 106 shared many similarities to the Bo 105, the principal difference being a widened cabin area, capable of seating three abreast in the front row and four abreast in the rear of the cabin. However, nothing further came of the Bo 106 project.

In 1976, the Bo 105CB, equipped with more powerful Allison 250-C20B engines, was introduced. The Bo 105C was further developed to become the Bo 105CBS, the primary change being a fuselage stretch of 10 inches to meet American demand for emergency medical service (EMS) operations; this version was often referred to as the Bo 105 Twin Jet in the United States. US aerospace firm Boeing-Vertol served as a partner in the type's production and further development, and marketed the BO 105 in the US. The Bo 105 CB and the Bo 105 CBS variants were also subject to license manufacturing agreements, leading to them being produced by the Philippine Aerospace Development Corporation in the Philippines, Indonesian Aerospace (IPTN) in Indonesia, and Construcciones Aeronáuticas SA (CASA) in Spain in addition to the main production line in Germany.

In 1984, the Bo 105LS was developed with the enlarged fuselage of the Bo 105CBS combined with more powerful Allison 250-C28C engines to increase the maximum take-off weight as well as hot-and-high flight performance; the Bo 105 LS was manufactured under a cooperative arrangement with Eurocopter Canada. Improvements and modifications to the Bo 105 LS continued until 1995.

Production of the Bo 105 by Eurocopter formally ended in 2001, principally due to the type having been superseded by the more modern Eurocopter EC135, itself a direct development from the Bo 105. By the end of production, 1,406 rotorcraft had been manufactured and delivered to operators in 55 nations worldwide.

Design

The Bo 105 has a reputation for having high levels of maneuverability; certain variants have been designed for aerobatic maneuvers and used for promotional purposes by operators, one such operator in this capacity being professional pilot Aaron Fitzgerald, flying for Red Bull. During the 1970s, the Bo 105 was known for having a great useful load capacity and higher cruise speed than the majority of its competitors. While not being considered a visually attractive helicopter by some pilots, the Bo 105 was known for possessing steady, responsive controls and a good flight attitude. Most models could perform steep dives, rolls, loops, turnovers, and various aerobatic maneuvers; according to MBB the Bo 105 is cleared for up to 3.5 positive G force and one negative. One benefit of the Bo 105's handling and control style is superior takeoff performance, including significant resistance to catastrophic dynamic rollover; a combination of light weight and the twin-engined configuration enables a rapid ascent in a performance takeoff.

Perhaps the most significant feature of the Bo 105 is its rotor blades and rotor head. The rotor system is entirely hingeless, the rotor head consisting of a solid titanium block to which the four blades are bolted; the flexibility of the rotor blades works to absorb movements typically requiring hinges in most helicopter rotor designs. The rotor blades are made from reinforced-plastic glass-fiber composite material; the flexibility of the main rotor allows for active elements other than rotor pitch changes to be removed, greatly simplifying maintenance and extending blade lifespan. The reliability of the advanced rotor system is such that, in over six million operating hours across the fleet, there was a total of zero failures (as of 1991). The rigid rotor blade design adopted on the Bo 105 has been partially responsible for the type's agility and responsiveness; it remained an uncommon feature on competing helicopters throughout the Bo 105's production life.

Military operators would commonly operate the type at a very low altitude to minimise visibility to enemies, the Bo 105 being well matched to such operations, as the helicopter's flight qualities effectively removed or greatly minimised several of the hazards such a flight profile could pose to pilots. When outfitted with optional auxiliary fuel tanks, a basic model Bo 105 had a flight endurance of roughly five hours under load. In the event of a single engine failure, the Bo 105 could typically continue its flight, albeit with a reduction in cruise speed and range. Besides the two pilots, the cabin can be configured to accommodate up to three passengers on a single rear bench, which can be removed to make room for cargo or a stretcher, which can be loaded and unloaded via the large clamshell doors located at the rear of the fuselage. In a maritime context, the BO 105 can be equipped with auxiliary fuel tanks, emergency flotation equipment, an inflatable life raft, folding rotor blades and high skid landing gear.

Operational history

In 1975, the German Army decided to procure a specialist anti-tank version armed with up to six Euromissile HOT missiles, designated as the Bo 105 PAH-1. A total of 212 Bo 105 PAH-1s were delivered between 1979 and 1984. German Army leaders saw the PAH-1 as a temporary measure only, having originally sought a more capable anti-tank helicopter; they were particularly dissatisfied with the PAH-1's inability to perform nighttime combat missions and its self-protection capabilities; ultimately, the Eurocopter Tiger was developed as a replacement. In 1977, the German Ministry of Defence selected the Bo 105C for its light observation helicopter (VBH) program, leading to the procurement of another 100 rotorcraft.

During the 1970s, MBB issued a license to produce the Bo 105 to Indonesian Aerospace (IPTN) as part of a wider agreement to help develop Indonesia's aviation industry. Within ten years, manufacture of the Bo 105 had been entirely localised within IPTN's own facilities. The Bo 105 has been used by various branches of the Indonesian National Armed Forces; military-operated Bo 105s have been reportedly used during the 1999 East Timorese crisis and the Papua conflict. Indonesian Bo 105s have also participated in several large-scale joint exercises.

The Mexican Navy operated a number of armed Bo 105s to perform maritime reconnaissance duties; during the early 1980s, Mexico procured a number of a Uribe-class patrol vessels which were equipped to handle the Bo 105 for off-shore operations. In 2005, work was completed on a series of upgrades to 11 of the Mexican Navy's Bo 105s, having received Forward looking infrared (FLIR) sensors, Global Positioning System (GPS) receivers, search radars, new rotor blades, armament pylons, and other changes. In November 2014, Jet Rescue Air Ambulance inaugurated Mexico's first dedicated civil air ambulance rotorcraft using a Bo 105.

During the late 1990s, the Republic of Korea Army aviation procured a number of Bo 105s as part of an ongoing drive to improve the force's reconnaissance and surveillance capabilities; these were manufactured under a co-production arrangement between Eurocopter and the newly formed Korea Aerospace Industries (KAI), receiving the designation Korean Light Helicopter (KLH), KAI also promoted the type to export customers.

The Bo 105 gained widespread use by emergency medical service (EMS) / medevac operators; in 1998, Flying Magazine reported that between the Bo 105 and the MBB/Kawasaki BK 117 (a newer rotorcraft derived from the Bo 105), MBB held 35% of the EMS market share. The first EMS-orientated Bo 105 in Scotland entered service in 1989; in November 2015, the last Bo 105 air ambulance operated in Britain was retired, the type having typically been replaced by the newer Eurocopter EC135. In 2009, the last Bo 105 to be produced was purchased by Canadian EMS specialist Dam Helicopters.

In May 2014, Airbus Helicopter reported that, worldwide, the Bo 105 had accumulated 8 million flight hours, and that approximately 700 Bo 105s remained in service.

Since 1979, the German Army has received 312 B0 105s, comprising 212 PAH anti-tank versions and 100 M-versions as liaison and observation helicopters. The helicopter was retired from German Army service on 13 December 2016 with an 18-aircraft formation flyby from their base in Celle. The Bohicans, as their pilots were called, had clocked over 1.38 million flying hours.

Variants

The variants used by the German Army are the Bo 105P and Bo 105M.
Bo 105AFirst production model primarily for civil use and equipped with two Allison 250-C18 turbine engines.
Bo 105ATHHOT-armed anti-tank version for the Spanish Army. Local designation HA.15.
Bo 105CInitial version. Developed in 1972 and equipped with two Allison 250-C20 turbines engines.
Bo 105CB Main production version from 1975, powered by two  Allison 250-C20B engines.

EC-Super FiveHigh performance version of the Bo 105CBS.
Bo 105CBS-5Also known as Superfive, with increased lifting capabilities similar to the LS A3 Superlifter
Bo 105DUK certified offshore version.
Bo 105GSHArmed scout version for the Spanish Army. Local designation HR.15.
Bo 105 KLHlicense-produced combat version of CBS-5 custom-fitted with Korean mission equipment package including communication, navigation, electronic warfare and target acquisition system, to meet Republic of Korea Army's operational requirements. KLH also has greatly improved rotor blade and transmission system. 12 are in service.
Bo 105LOHObservation version for the Spanish Army. Local designation HR.15.
Bo 105LS A1Developed in 1984 with stretched fuselage and two Allison 250-C28C turbine engines.
Bo 105LS A3Developed in 1986 with maximum take-off weight increased to 2,600 kg.
Bo 105LS A3 "Superlifter"Developed in 1995 with maximum mission weight increased to 2,850 kg.
Bo 105M Light transport and surveillance helicopter for West German Army. German Army designation VBH (Verbindungshubschrauber; 'liaison helicopter'). They were phased out and replaced by disarmed and modified PAH1.
Bo 105MSSMaritime version, fitted a search radar.
Bo 105P/BSH Proposed modification of PAH-1s into escort version for the German Army, armed with Stinger air-to-air missiles. Cancelled 1993.
Bo 105P/PAH-1 Anti-tank helicopter armed with wire-guided HOT ATGMs for West German Army. German Army designation "PAH-1" (PAH=Panzerabwehrhubschrauber; 'Anti-tank helicopter'). Following the arrival of the Eurocopter Tiger attack helicopter, some were retired while others disarmed and downgraded to the VBH version for continued service.
Bo 105P/PAH-1A1Upgrade of PAH-1 anti-tank version for the German Army.
Bo 105P/PAH-1 Phase 2 Planned further upgraded version of PAH-1 with infra-red roof mounted sight for HOT-2 missiles giving a night attack capability. Programme cancelled 1993.
Bo 105SSearch and rescue version.
Bo 105/OpheliaTest and trials aircraft fitted with a mast-mounted sight.
NBO-105Were Manufactured by IPTN under license from MBB (now Airbus Helicopters) 1976–2011; only rotors and transmission now supplied by Germany; originally NBO-105 CB, but stretched NBO-105 CBS available from 101st aircraft onwards. 122 were produced, Dirgantara Indonesia stopped production in 2008.
NBO-105SStretched version.
Bo 105 Executaire Boeing Vertol and Carson Helicopters manufactured a 24.5 cm stretched version of the Bo 105 under license as the Executaire in an attempt to break into the U.S. light helicopter market, but sales were dismal.
Bo 105E-412 German Army Bo 105P upgraded and overhauled for a 10 million euro contract and donated to Albania first batch delivered in 2006, the helicopters have better performance and avionics. The conversion of other Bo 105 helicopters from the German Armed Forces is also under consideration with a view to future sales.
Bo 106Widened cabin to seat 7 instead of 5. First flight was on 26 September 1973. A single helicopter of that variant has been made (registration D-HDCI, serial no. 84). The Bo 106 was also equipped with more powerful Allison 250 C 20B engines. In 1981, the German air rescue organization Deutsche Rettungsflugwacht/DRF Luftrettung bought that prototype and had it rebuilt into a 105 CB-2 with a standard cabin. It flew for DRF until November 1993 under the registration D-HCCC, but in 1994 it was put aside to gain spare parts for another DRF helicopter (Bo 105 CBS-S, registration D-HNNN, serial number 662).
PADC Hummingbird An unlicensed development of the Bo 105C with revised cockpit structure.

Operators

Military

 Albanian Air Force 

 Royal Bahraini Air Force 
 Royal Bahrain Naval Force

 Chilean Navy

 Colombian Navy

 Honduran Air Force

 Indonesian Army
 Indonesian Navy

 Mexican Navy

 Peruvian Air Force

 Philippine Army
 Philippine Navy

 Republic of Korea Army

 Sudanese Air Force

 Spanish Army

 Armed Forces of Ukraine — 1 example

Government 

 Buenos Aires Province Police
 Santa Fe Province Police
 Policía Federal Argentina
 Módena Helicópteros lease to paramedic services.

 Carabineros de Chile

 German State Police

 Indonesian National Police
 National Search and Rescue Agency
National Disaster Management Authority

 Philippine Coast Guard

 Ministry of Emergency Situations

 South African Police Service
 
Customs Service
 National Police
Guardia Civil

Former

 Royal Brunei Air Force

 Canadian Coast Guard - all retired in 2016 after Bell 429 delivered

 Chilean Air Force

 Ciskei Defence Force

 FinnHEMS

 German Army

 Iraqi Air Force

 Royal Netherlands Air Force
 Dutch Aviation Police

 Nigerian Air Force

 Philippine Air Force

 Sierra Leone Air Arm

 Sudanese Police Force

 Swedish Air Force Hkp9B Four Bo 105CB4 used for light air rescue, equipped with winch.

 Swedish Army
Arméflyget, Hkp 9A, 21 individuals of Bo 105CB3 used as anti-tank missile carriers equipped with 4 SAAB HeliTOW between 1987 and 1998 with one company stationed in AF 1, Boden and the other company in Af 2, Linköping. In 1998 they were transferred to:
Försvarsmaktens helikopterflottilj:where all helicopters in the Swedish armed forces fell under common command. Here the Hkp 9A were disarmed and used for light transports and schooling until 2009.

 Trinidad and Tobago Defence Force

 United Arab Emirates Air Force

 New York Police Department
 Petroleum Helicopters Inc.

 Uruguayan Navy

Accidents and incidents
 27 June 2017 - A hijacked Bo 105 of the Venezuelan criminal investigation agency (CICPC) was used to attack the Supreme Tribunal of Justice and the Interior Ministry in Caracas, Venezuela.

Aircraft on display
Since 2011 a Bo 105 in yellow rescue livery is part of an art installation by Alfred Gockel at the Kamener Kreuz (Motorway intersection of A1 and A2 in Germany).

Specifications (Bo 105CB)

See also

References

Citations

Bibliography

External links

 Eurocopter history on Bo 105
 Airliners.net info on Bo 105
 Bo 105 info from Federation of American Scientists
 Lahak Aviation Ltd. Israel Bo 105 EMS and VIP Operator
 Bo 105 Photos and Walk Arounds on Prime Portal

1960s German military utility aircraft
Bo 105
Military helicopters
1960s German helicopters
Bo 105
Twin-turbine helicopters
Aircraft first flown in 1967